Elections to the French National Assembly were held in Guinea on 21 October 1945, with a second round of voting on 18 November. Maurice Chevrance-Bertin and Yacine Diallo were elected.

Electoral system
The two seats allocated to the constituency were elected on two separate electoral rolls; French citizens elected one MP from the first college, whilst non-citizens elected one MP in the second college.

Campaign
The elections were effectively a contest between the Fula and Mandinka. However, two Mandinka candidates stood, splitting their vote, whilst Yacine Diallo was the only Fula to stand.

Results

First College

Second College

Aftermath
Following the elections, Senegalese MP Lamine Guèye attempted to persuade all the African MPs to form an African Bloc, which would be affiliated with the SFIO. Although, the attempt failed, Diallo did sit with the SFIO.

References

Guibea
October 1945 events in Africa
Elections in Guinea
1945 in Guinea
Guinea
Election and referendum articles with incomplete results